Arthur Withy (February 1870 – 24 September 1943) was a New Zealand journalist and political activist.

Political activity

Born in Seaton Carew in England in 1870, Withy arrived in New Zealand in 1884. He was a journalist and prominent single-taxer (i.e. a land tax) and follower of Henry George. He was Secretary of the New Zealand Land Values League.

Arthur Withy was a Liberal Party (UK) candidate for South Herefordshire in the United Kingdom in 1895 and a candidate for the New Zealand Liberal Party for the Parnell electorate in 1896. He was a member of the United Labour Party National Executive 1912-13 and an Independent Labour candidate for Auckland East in 1911.

Arthur Withy died on 24 September 1943.

Withy's father Edward Withy had been a shipbuilder in Bristol, England until he emigrated to New Zealand in 1884. He represented Newton in the New Zealand Parliament from 1887 to 1890.

Further reading

Labour's Path to Political Independence: the Origins and Establishment of the NZLP 1900-19 by Barry Gustafson (1980, Oxford University Press, Auckland)

References

1870 births
1943 deaths
New Zealand journalists
Georgist politicians
New Zealand people of English descent
New Zealand Liberal Party politicians
New Zealand Labour Party politicians
Liberal Party (UK) parliamentary candidates
New Zealand Labour Party (1910) politicians
United Labour Party (New Zealand) politicians
Unsuccessful candidates in the 1896 New Zealand general election
Unsuccessful candidates in the 1911 New Zealand general election
People from Seaton Carew